The HK P2A1 is a single-shot, break action flare pistol designed for signaling and illumination purposes.

It can fire either 25 mm or 26.5 mm flares, or smoke cartridges. Adapters are available to use commercial 12-gauge flares available at sporting goods stores.

The body of the pistol is mostly polymer composite, with the barrel and breech being made of steel. The P2A1 has a life expectancy of about 1500 shots of full power flares.

The P2A1 is called the "SigPi" in the Bundeswehr, standing for "Signalpistole" or signal handgun.

External links
 Official P2A1 page

Flare guns
Heckler & Koch pistols